Amonafide (originally AS1413) (INN, trade names Quinamed and Xanafide) was a drug that was being studied in the treatment of cancer. It belongs to a novel family of chemotherapeutic drugs called Naphthalimides and is a potential topoisomerase inhibitor and DNA intercalator.

It was being developed as an anti-cancer therapy by Antisoma.

, it is in Phase III clinical trials.
e.g. In March 2010 it is Phase III trial against secondary acute myeloid leukaemia (AML). In June 2010, it gained an FDA Fast Track Status for the treatment of Secondary Acute Myeloid Leukaemia.

See also
 Alrestatin

References

External links 
 Amonafide entry in the public domain NCI Dictionary of Cancer Terms
 Clinical trials of amonafide at ClinicalTrials.gov

Experimental cancer drugs